Eppendorf (Westphalian: Eppendörp) is a district of Bochum in the Ruhr area in North Rhine-Westphalia in Germany. It lies between Höntrop and Weitmar.

The population used to speak Westphalian, but now High German languages are the norm. Eppendorf belongs to the Stadtbezirk (district of the town) of Wattenscheid, which was a town until 1974. Eppendorf is the richest part of Wattenscheid.

Bochum